Alec Coombes (born 26 November 1995) is a Scottish rugby union player for Glasgow Warriors in the Pro14. Coombes' primary position is centre.

Personal
Coombes attended Millfield School.

Career
Coombes signed for Glasgow Warriors in the summer of 2019.

References

External links
 
 
 
 

1995 births
Living people
Hong Kong rugby union players
Glasgow Warriors players
London Scottish F.C. players
Rugby sevens players at the 2020 Summer Olympics
Olympic rugby sevens players of Great Britain
Rugby sevens players at the 2022 Commonwealth Games
People educated at Millfield